Maneka Sardar is an Indian politician and member of the Bharatiya Janata Party. Sardar was a member of the Jharkhand Legislative Assembly from the Potka constituency in Purbi Singhbhum district.

See also
Potka (Vidhan Sabha constituency)
Sanjib Sardar

References 

People from East Singhbhum district
Bharatiya Janata Party politicians from Jharkhand
Members of the Jharkhand Legislative Assembly
Jharkhand politicians
Living people
21st-century Indian politicians
Year of birth missing (living people)
Bhumij people
Adivasi politicians